Reunion in Rhythm is a studio album by Frankie Laine with Michel Legrand and his orchestra, released in 1959 on Columbia Records.

Track listing

References 

1959 albums
Frankie Laine albums
Columbia Records albums